J boat may refer to:

J/Boats, an American sailboat manufacturer
J-class yacht, a single-masted racing sailboat built to the specifications of Nathanael Herreshoff's Universal Rule.